Bruce Reid Sr. (27 April 1929 – 24 August 1955) was an Australian rules footballer who played with Footscray in the Victorian Football League (VFL).

Reid, a Romsey recruit, played 17 of a possible 19 games in the 1949 VFL season. He added another eight games the following year but appeared just three times in 1951, his final season.

He was the father of Bruce Reid Jr. and John Reid, who both would also play for Footscray.  He died in August 1955, 4 months before Bruce junior was born.

References

1929 births
1955 deaths
Australian rules footballers from Bendigo
Western Bulldogs players